Marvelous World (The Marvelous World Saga) is a young adult (YA) fantasy novel series by Troy CLE and published by Simon & Schuster and Random House Listening Library Audio.

Series Synopsis 

Marvelous World aka The Marvelous World Saga is a union of pop culture, classic literature and philosophy, thought provoking themes and intense action. The saga primarily takes place in the present day on earth. It centers around the life of Louis Proof and Cyndi Victoria Chase. They are two special teenagers working from opposing sides who must deal with an omnipotent celestial threat that is unraveling both space and time. There are currently two books in the series: The Marvelous Effect & Olivion's Favorites.

External References 
Marvelous World Website
Publisher Website
New York Times Article

Young adult novel series
Series of children's books
Science fiction book series